This is a list of leaders of Middle Eastern and North African states. It consists of the heads of state and government within the Arab League, and of other MENA countries outside it.

Leaders of Arab League member states

Note: (*) means leadership is disputed.

Leaders of other states and unrecognised states in the MENA region

Notes

References

Arab League
Heads of state in the Middle East